The RIT Tigers are composed of 22 teams representing Rochester Institute of Technology in intercollegiate athletics, including men and women's basketball, crew, cross country, ice hockey, lacrosse, soccer, swimming & diving, tennis, and track and field. Men's sports include baseball and wrestling. Women's sports include softball, and volleyball. The Tigers compete in the NCAA Division III and are members of the Liberty League for all sports except ice hockey, which competes in NCAA Division I. The men's ice hockey team is a member of Atlantic Hockey, while the women's ice hockey team is a member of College Hockey America.

Teams

Men's basketball

Men's basketball at RIT started with the 1915–16 season. In the 1955–56 season under coach A. Leo Fox, they went undefeated with 17 wins and 0 losses. They participated in the NCAA Division III men's basketball tournament in 1976, 1995, 1996, 1997, 1999, 2000, and 2009.

Women's basketball

Women's basketball began at RIT with their first varsity match on January 6, 1988, when they lost to the Brockport Golden Eagles 73–39. Their first postseason appearance took place in the 2007 Empire 8 tournament. They appeared in the NCAA Division III tournament in 2017, 2018, and 2019.

Football

RIT had an early football team that ceased playing circa 1922. In 1968, a club football team was formed, and in 1971, football became a university-sanctioned sport as the team joined NCAA Division II. They moved to NCAA Division III in 1973. In January 1978, after seven seasons, RIT discontinued its football program on the basis that they would not be able to commit sufficient funding to the team.

Men's ice hockey

The men's ice hockey at RIT dates back to an amateur team founded by an RIT student in 1957. Men's ice hockey became a varsity sport at RIT when they debuted in NCAA Division II in the 1962–63 season. They won the 1983 NCAA Division II tournament and the 1985 NCAA Division III tournament. They moved up to NCAA Division I for the 2005–06 season.

Women's ice hockey

The RIT women's hockey team began with the 1975–76 season. They won the 2012 NCAA Division III tournament before moving up to NCAA Division I the following season. They now compete in College Hockey America, part of NCAA Division I.

Men's lacrosse

The RIT Tigers men's lacrosse team dates back to 1964, when a lacrosse club was organized on campus. The club played their first season in the spring of 1966. In 1968, men's lacrosse became a university-sanctioned sport and the Tigers played their first season in NCAA Division II. They moved down to Division III beginning with the 1974 season.

In 2021, the RIT Tigers won the NCAA Division III men's lacrosse tournament, defeating the Salisbury Sea Gulls in the championship game to cap off an undefeated season. The team would repeat as national champions in 2022 when they defeated Union College, 12–10.

Men's soccer

RIT's men's soccer team records go back to 1960. They play in NCAA Division III.  their best performance in the NCAA Division III Men's Soccer Championship came in 1988, when they lost 3–0 in the final game to the UC San Diego Tritons.

Women's soccer

RIT's women's soccer team dates back to 1982. They play in NCAA Division III.

History
RIT was a long-time member of the Empire 8, an NCAA Division III athletic conference, but moved to the Liberty League beginning with the 2011–2012 academic year. All of RIT's teams compete at the Division III level, with the exception of the men's and women's ice hockey programs, which play at the Division I level. In 2010, the men's ice hockey team was the first ever from the Atlantic Hockey conference to reach the NCAA tournament semi-finals: The Frozen Four.

On March 17, 2012, the women's ice hockey team, after finishing the regular season with a record of 28–1–1, won its first NCAA Division III national championship, defeating the defending champion Norwich University 4–1. The women's team had carried a record of 54–3–3 over their past 2 regular seasons leading up to that point.  Three days later, RIT successfully applied for the women's hockey team to move from Division III to Division I. Starting in the 2012–2013 season, the women's team joined the College Hockey America conference, and was be eligible for conference postseason play, but not NCAA postseason play. The moratorium on the NCAA postseason was lifted 2 years later beginning with the 2014–2015 season.

Additionally, RIT has a wide variety of club, intramural, and pick-up sports and teams to provide a less-competitive recreational option to students.

Tom Coughlin, coach of the NFL's 2008 and 2012 Super Bowl champion New York Giants, taught physical education and coached the RIT Men's Varsity Football team in the 1970s.

Since 1968 the school's hockey teams played at Frank Ritter Memorial Ice Arena on campus, but in 2010, the school launched the "Power Play" campaign, in which it hoped to raise 15 of the 30 million dollars it would cost to build a new arena. On November 11, 2011 it was announced that B. Thomas Golisano and the Polisseni Foundation were donating 4.5 million to the new arena, which came to be named the Gene Polisseni Center. The new 4,300 seat arena was completed in 2014 and the Men's and Women's teams moved into the new facility in September for the 2014–2015 season.

Championships

Mascot

RIT's athletics nickname is the "Tigers", a name given following the undefeated men's basketball season of 1955–56. Prior to that, RIT's athletic teams were called the "Techmen" and had blue and silver as the sports colors. In 1963, RIT purchased a rescued Bengal tiger which became the Institute's mascot, named SPIRIT. He was taken to sports events until late spring, when he was moved to the Seneca Park Zoo. A year and a half later, when X-rays revealed he was suffering from genetic pelvic and leg joint problems, he was humanely euthanized. The original tiger's pelt now resides in the school's archives at the on-campus library. RIT helped the Seneca Park Zoo purchase a new tiger shortly after SPIRIT's death, but it was not used as a school mascot. A metal sculpture in the center of the Henrietta campus now provides an everlasting version of the mascot.

RIT's team mascot is a version of this Bengal Tiger named RITchie. RITchie was the selected name entered in 1989 by alumnus Richard P. Mislan  during a College Activities Board "Name the RIT Tiger" contest. After it was announced that the RIT men's hockey team was moving from Division III to Division I in 2005, RITchie was redesigned and made his debut in the fall of 2006.

References

Further reading

External links
 
 RIT at NCAA Statistics